Zvi Tendler (born 2 November 1937) is an Israeli footballer. He played in five matches for the Israel national football team in 1961.

References

External links
 

1937 births
Living people
Israeli footballers
Israel international footballers
Place of birth missing (living people)
Association footballers not categorized by position